Toronto Cathedral may refer to:

 the Anglican Cathedral of St James
 the Roman Catholic Cathedral of St Michael
 the Polish National Catholic Cathedral of St John
 the Macedonian Orthodox Cathedral of St Clement of Ohrid
 the Ukrainian Orthodox  Cathedral of St Vlodymyr